The SWM X3 is a 7-seater compact crossover that is manufactured by the Chinese manufacturer SWM (automobiles) of Brilliance Shineray. The SWM X3 was launched on the 2017 Shanghai Auto Show in China.

Overview

Developed based on the same platform as the SWM X2, which is a rebadged Jinbei 750, the power of the SWM X3 comes from 3 engine options including the 1.5 liter DG15 engine, DG16 engines and the turbo DG15T engine developed by Brilliance. Prices of the SWM X3 ranges from 55,000 yuan to 82,900 yuan.

References

External links

X3
Compact sport utility vehicles
Crossover sport utility vehicles
Compact MPVs
2010s cars
Cars introduced in 2018
Front-wheel-drive vehicles
Cars of China